Sunway Berhad or Sunway Group is a Malaysian conglomerate company. It was formed following a merger between Sunway City Berhad (SunCity) and Sunway Holdings Berhad on 23 August 2011.

Sunway Holdings Incorporated Berhad commenced operations in 1986, mainly to develop the Bandar Sunway township in Petaling Jaya. It was listed on Bursa Malaysia Securities Berhad on 16 February 1984. Sunway City Berhad on the other hand, was incorporated in 1982 and engages in the investment and development of residential, commercial, retail, leisure, and healthcare properties primarily in Asia.

Following the success of the Sunway City township, the Group diversified into property investment, leisure and entertainment, hospitality and healthcare. Today Sunway maintains property development and construction as its two core businesses and key contributors to profitability.

Notable subsidiaries
Most notable subsidiaries located close to the headquarters in Bandar Sunway. These include two main hotels: Sunway Resort Hotel and Spa and the Pyramid Tower Hotel. Other tourism-related facilities include the Sunway Pyramid shopping mall, Sunway Lagoon theme park, various beverage and entertainment outlets and other leisure facilities.

Sunway Group is the parent company of Sunway Education Group. The group comprises 8 different educational institutions, which are Monash University Malaysia, Sunway University, Sunway Le Cordon Bleu Institute of Culinary Arts, Sunway College, Sunway International School, and Sunway International School Sunway Iskandar. Sunway Group is the part owner of the Campus.

Sunway Resort Hotel & Spa
Sunway Resort Hotel & Spa is one of the largest hotel developments in Greater Kuala Lumpur, integrating a complex of five hotels with 1,234 guestrooms, suites, luxury villas and serviced residences.

See also
Sunway Pyramid
 Sunway Putra Mall
Sunway Velocity
Sunway Carnival Mall
Sunway City Ipoh
Sunway College
Sunway University
Sunway Lagoon
Sunway Lost World Of Tambun

References

External links

Official site
Amazing Sunway City Kuala Lumpur, Malaysia’s must-visit destination.

 
1974 establishments in Malaysia
Conglomerate companies established in 1974
Companies based in Petaling Jaya
Malaysian brands
Companies listed on Bursa Malaysia